Mirabello is a suburb of Pavia, Lombardy, northern Italy. It lies north of the city, bordering San Genesio ed Uniti.

History 
Mirabello was the main center of the Old Park (Parco Vecchio) and the residence of Captain of the Park. The Old Park was the older part of the vast park created by the Visconti family linking the Castle of Pavia with Certosa. After the downfall of the House of Sforza and the decadence of the Park, Mirabello remained as an autonomous administrative entity. In the 18th century the commune of Torre Pescarina is united to Mirabello, and in 1841 the commune of Cantugno was also added. In 1863 the comune takes the name of Mirabello e Uniti di Pavia. In 1883 some fractions (Scala and Torretta among others) are united with the comune of Pavia. In 1939 the comune is suppressed and united to Pavia and partly to San Genesio ed Uniti.

Demography 
Demographic evolution 
700 residents in 1751
916 in 1805
1.802 in 1861

See also
Mirabello Castle

References

Bibliography
 

Cities and towns in Lombardy
Province of Pavia